Cosmosphere is a space museum and STEM education center in Hutchinson, Kansas, United States.  It was previously known as the Kansas Cosmosphere.  The museum houses over 13,000 spaceflight artifacts—the largest combined collection of US and Russian spaceflight artifacts in the world—and is home to internationally acclaimed educational programs.

Facilities
The Cosmosphere grew from a planetarium established on the Kansas State Fairgrounds in 1962. The  facility houses the largest collection of Russian space artifacts outside of Moscow, and a collection of US space artifacts second only to the National Air and Space Museum in Washington, D.C.

The Cosmosphere has four venues: The Hall of Space Museum, The Justice Planetarium, The Carey Digital Dome Theater, and Dr. Goddard's Lab (an explosive live science presentation on the history of rocketry). The Cosmosphere also hosts summer camps for all ages, and co-curricular applied STEM education programs for field trips, groups, and scouts that meet Next Generation Science Standards and common core, focused on college and career readiness.

The Cosmosphere is the only Smithsonian affiliate museum in Kansas.

In 2012, the Carey Digital Dome Theater upgraded from IMAX to 4K digital projection.

In 2015, the Justice Planetarium underwent a complete renovation, transitioning from an optical starball projection system to the Spitz Sci-Dome XD digital projection system.

In 2021, three of the museum's oldest galleries began renovations: the German Gallery, the Redstone and Sputnik Gallery, and the Kennedy Theater.  These galleries opened during the late 1990s, and will get repainted, new graphics, and new sound.

Restoration and replication
The Cosmosphere's SpaceWorks division has restored flown U.S. spacecraft for museums and exhibits across the globe, including artifacts that are part of the collection of the Smithsonian Institution National Air and Space Museum. Two examples of this work are the Apollo 13 Command Module Odyssey, and the Liberty Bell 7 – both on display at the Cosmosphere. The Cosmosphere built roughly 80% of the artifacts and props for the movie Apollo 13 and of the replicated spacecraft hardware seen in Magnificent Desolation: Walking on the Moon 3D; and the TV mini-series From the Earth to the Moon.

Collection

Flown items included in the Cosmosphere's collection are a Lockheed SR-71 Blackbird, the Liberty Bell 7 Mercury spacecraft, the Gemini 10 space capsule, and the Command Module Odyssey from Apollo 13. Additionally, authentic Redstone and Titan II launch vehicles used in the Mercury and Gemini programs flank the building's exterior.  A prized item on display is a Moon rock from Apollo 11, the first manned mission to land on the Moon.

Every artifact on display at the Cosmosphere is either an actual flown artifact, a "flight-ready backup" (identical to the item actually flown), an engineering model, or a historically accurate replica.

The Cosmosphere museum begins with the earliest experiments in rocketry during the World War II era, explores through the Space Race and Cold War, and continues through modern times with the Space Shuttle and International Space Station, as well as SpaceShipOne and commercial spaceflight.

Notable Items on display:

Germany
 Restored World War II German V-1 flying bomb missile (authentic)
 Restored World War II German V-2 rocket (authentic)
 Walter HWK 109-509 rocket engine from a Messerschmitt Me 163 Komet
 Section of the Berlin Wall – last section removed (authentic)

Russia / Soviet Union / USSR
 Sputnik 1 (flight-ready backup)
 Apollo-Soyuz Test Project Craft (joint venture with USA) (full-scale replica)
 Vostok space capsule (competitor against Mercury program)
 Voskhod 2 space capsule (competitor against Gemini program)
 Prototype and flown Russian space suits

United States

Winged aircraft
 Lockheed SR-71 Blackbird reconnaissance plane (flown)
 Northrop T-38 Talon supersonic jet trainer in NASA livery (flown)
 XLR11 and XLR99 rocket engines from the North American X-15 program (flown)
 Replica of the Bell X-1 Glamorous Glennis, used in the filming of The Right Stuff movie
 Engine from Bell X-1 Glamorous Glennis, pilot Chuck Yeager (flown)

Mercury space program
 Liberty Bell 7 Mercury spacecraft, recovered from the bottom of the Atlantic Ocean. It is the only spacecraft flown by NASA but owned by an entity other than NASA or the Smithsonian (owned by Cosmosphere).
 Mercury-Redstone Launch Vehicle rocket (authentic) (standing vertical outdoors)

Gemini space program
 Gemini 10 space capsule (flown)
 Titan II rocket used in the Gemini program (authentic) (standing vertical outdoors)

Apollo space program
 Apollo 13 command module Odyssey (flown)
 Lunar Roving Vehicle (full-scale replica)
 Lunar Module and surface experiment suite (full-scale replica)
 Apollo White Room (authentic)
 Moon rock collected during Apollo 11
 Multiple cameras and items carried on Apollo flights (flown)
 Rocketdyne F-1 engine components recovered from the ocean (flown), unused engine outdoors

Space Shuttle space program
 Full-scale replica of Space Shuttle Endeavour (left side only) 
 Piece of tile from the Space Shuttle Columbia disaster (flown)

Various space programs
 Vanguard 1 satellite (flight-ready backup)
 Prototype and flown American space suits

Controversy
In November 2003, the Cosmosphere released a statement indicating that a routine audit had revealed many missing items from the museum. Over a year later, in April 2005, former Cosmosphere director Max Ary was charged with stealing artifacts from the museum's collection and selling the pieces for personal profit.  Some of the missing items included a nose cone, silk screens, boot covers, nuts and bolts, an Air Force One control panel, and a tape of the Apollo 15 landing which Ary sold for $2,200.

Additional charges involved the theft of dozens more artifacts from the Cosmosphere when he left in 2002, and false insurance claims made on the loss of an astronaut's Omega watch replica. Ary had also failed to notify NASA of the loss of the watch.

Ary went on trial in 2005. He testified that the artifacts he sold were from his private collection which he had accumulated through undocumented trades and salvage of unwanted items. He also stated he had received numerous personal gifts from astronauts. Some of the items in question were supposedly brought with him from the Noble Planetarium in 1976 and incorporated into the Cosmosphere's permanent collection, and in many cases, ownership of artifacts could not be proved on Ary's behalf or the Cosmosphere's.

Ary was found guilty on 12 counts. On May 15, 2006, he was sentenced to three years in prison and ordered to pay restitution of $132,000.  In 2008 he lost his appeal, and began to serve his sentence in a federal prison in El Reno, Oklahoma on April 24, 2008. Ary has repeatedly proclaimed his innocence. He was released on good behavior in June 2010.

See also

 Strataca, salt mine museum, in Hutchinson
 Combat Air Museum in Topeka
 Kansas Aviation Museum in Wichita
 Mid-America Air Museum in Liberal
 List of aerospace museums
 List of museums in Kansas

References

External links

 
 Cosmosphere Photo Gallery
 Cosmophere Camps – Summer Camp and Scouting Programs
 Cosmosphere info and photos, kansastravel.org
 We Are The Explorers, NASA Promotional Video (Press Release)
 Hutchinson City Map, KDOT

1962 establishments in Kansas
Aerospace museums in Kansas
Hutchinson, Kansas
Museums in Reno County, Kansas
Museums established in 1962
Planetaria in the United States
Smithsonian Institution affiliates